Villoo Morawala-Patell is the founder and current Chairman and Managing Director of an Indian Biotechnology company Avesthagen. 

Her efforts to create an Indian based intellectual-property driven biotechnology company attracted more than 70 million USD in venture capital before largely collapsing around 2012 with a failed public offering, the exit of senior executives, the shutdown of manufacturing and the cessation of most research activities.

Criminal and civil matters relating to Morawala-Patell and Avesthagen continue to be litigated through the courts.

Life and education 
Morawala-Patell earned a Master of Science degree in Medical Biochemistry from the University of Mumbai, then a PhD from the Institut de Biologie Moleculaire des Plantes (IBMP-CNRS), University of Strasbourg, France. Prior to obtaining her doctorate, Morawala-Patell worked as a research associate at ICRISAT (International Crop Research Institute for the Semi Arid Tropics (ICRISAT) for 10 years. After receiving her PhD, she returned to India, becoming a post-doctoral Rockefeller Fellow at the University of Ghent. Morawala-Patell was next a visiting scientist and Rockefeller Fellow at NCBS-TIFR, and Professor Emeritus at University of Agricultural Sciences, Bangalore.

Avesthagen 
Morawala-Patell founded Avesthagen Limited in 1998. Over the next two decades, the company was the recipient of more than 70 million USD in venture capital and strategic global funding and grew to become one of India's foremost biotechnology companies with more than 650 employees. The company acquired a large portfolio of patents and intellectual property that it was unable to adequately commercialise leading to revenue crisis around 2012. A failed public offering saw a number of exits by senior executives and retrospective salary cuts to existing staff that led to several former staff filing criminal and civil charges against the company for breaching employment contracts and failing to make payments into employee provident funds.

Awards 

 2005
 The GR8! Women Award for Science & Technology by the Indian Television Academy
 2008
 Officer of the National Order of Merit by the President of the French Republic
 Recognised by the Adolfo Ibanez University for Achievements in Innovation and Creation of Value. Award was conferred upon her at the opening of VentureL@b by President of Chile, Michelle Bachelet
 2009
 Karmaveer Puraskar award as a Corporate Citizen for her contribution in the field of agriculture and healthcare in by iCONGO for Citizen Action and Social Justice.
 Morawala-Patell received the prestigious the Businesswoman of the Year Award 2010 for business excellence at Satya Brahma founded Pharmaleaders 3rd Annual Pharmaceutical Leadership Summit 2010 in Mumbai.

References 

Living people
University of Mumbai alumni
Parsi people
Indian Zoroastrians
1955 births
Officers of the Ordre national du Mérite